Green Kendrick (April 1, 1798 – August 26, 1873) was an American politician who was elected as a Whig as the 43rd Lieutenant Governor of Connecticut from 1851 to 1852. As his party's nominee for governor in the 1852 election, he was defeated by the incumbent Democrat Thomas H. Seymour, gaining 45 percent of the vote. He later served as Speaker of the House in the 1854 and 1856 sessions of the state legislature.  He was the father of politician John Kendrick.

He died on August 26, 1873, and was interred at Riverside Cemetery in Waterbury, Connecticut.

References

External links 

 

Lieutenant Governors of Connecticut
Burials at Riverside Cemetery (Waterbury, Connecticut)
Connecticut Whigs
19th-century American politicians
1873 deaths
1789 births
Speakers of the Connecticut House of Representatives